is a Japanese professional football manager and former player. He was most recently the manager of Thai League 1 club BG Pathum United.

Playing career
Teguramori was born in Gonohe, Aomori on November 14, 1967. After graduating from high school, he joined Sumitomo Metal (later Kashima Antlers) in 1986. The club won the 2nd place in 1987 JSL Cup. In 1993, he moved to NEC Yamagata (later Montedio Yamagata). He retired in 1995.

Coaching career

Until 2003
After retirement, Teguramori started coaching career at Montedio Yamagata in 1996. He served as assistant coach until 2000. In 2001, he moved to Oita Trinita and served as physical coach and assistant coach until 2003.

Vegalta Sendai
In 2004, he moved to Vegalta Sendai and became a coach. In 2008, he became a manager first time in his career. In 2008 season, Vegalta finished the 3rd place in J2 League. In 2009 season, Vegalta won the champions and was promoted to J1 League. Immediately after the opening 2011 season, 2011 Tōhoku earthquake and tsunami occurred in Sendai. However Vegalta finished at the 4th place in 2011 season which is best place in the club history. In 2012 season, Vegalta won the 2nd place and qualified for 2013 AFC Champions League. He resigned with Vegalta end of 2013 season because he decided to be the manager of Japan U-23 national team for 2016 Summer Olympics.

Japan U-23 national team
In 2014 he became a manager for Japan U-23 national team and assistant coach for Japan national team. In 2016 AFC U-23 Championship held in Qatar, he managed Japan U-23 to win the Asian U-23 tournament for the first time, thus qualifying to join 2016 Summer Olympics as the champions of Asia. In 2016 Summer Olympics, he and his U-23 men obtained as many as four points at the group stage, nonetheless ending up at only the third place behind Nigeria and Colombia in Group B. This was not sufficient for them to qualify to the next stage.

V-Varen Nagasaki
In 2019, he signed with J2 League club V-Varen Nagasaki.

BG Pathum United
In 2022, Makoto Teguramori has been appointed as the new BG Pathum United head coach. BG Pathum United have parted ways with Teguramori after the club lost to Bangkok United in Thai League 1 on Sunday night. 

On 24 October 2022, BG Pathum United have parted ways with coach Makoto Teguramori after the club lost to Bangkok United in Thai League 1 on 23 October 2022.

Club statistics

Managerial statistics

Honours

Manager
Vegalta Sendai
J.League Division 2: 2009
Japan U-23
AFC U-23 Championship: 2016
BG Pathum United
 Thailand Champions Cup: 2022

Individual
Thai League 1 Coach of the Month: April 2022

References

External links

1967 births
Living people
Association football people from Aomori Prefecture
Japanese footballers
Japan Soccer League players
J1 League players
Japan Football League (1992–1998) players
Kashima Antlers players
Montedio Yamagata players
Japanese football managers
J1 League managers
J2 League managers
Makoto Teguramori
Vegalta Sendai managers
V-Varen Nagasaki managers
Makoto Teguramori
Japanese twins
Twin sportspeople
Association football midfielders